Tahu Jessica Aponte (born December 2, 1980), better known by her stage name, Deemi, is an American singer, songwriter and record producer.

Biography
Deemi was raised in Bed-Stuy, Brooklyn, New York. She started singing at an early age. In 1988, when Deemi was at the age of 7, she won a neighborhood talent show.  Her song of choice was Whitney Houston's "Greatest Love of All." She was accepted into Manhattan's Talent Unlimited High School to perfect her craft. At the age of 17, she gave birth to her first child, Nathan.  She transferred to a new school and a year later, she had her second child, Felicity. She would later drop out of the school but returned to receive her GED. Things from that point fell apart. She relocated with the father of her children to Richmond, Virginia. She stated that at first it was verbal abuse but physical abuse soon followed. It got to the point she could not cover the bruises on her face. In 2000, she moved back to New York with her children. January 2004, her children's father was shot after being released from prison on drug charges 2 years.

Deemi openly talks about her life and the struggle. She talks about her relationship with her mom and that she was in an abusive relationship with the father of her two kids. In the song "Wasn't Surprised" she talks about his death.

Career
In 1998, she met producers Chris Styles and Bruce Waynne. The two helped her create a demo. Instead of merely talking about common relationship themes, they instead encouraged her to talk about her own life (including physical abuse at the hands of her father, as well as being the mother of two children prior to turning 21). Eventually she signed to Atlantic through a partnership between organizations run by Styles (Dangerous LLC.) and Waynne (the latter is one half of Midi Mafia).

Her first single is called "Soundtrack of My Life." Her debut album titled the same name, "Soundtrack of My Life"  was supposed to be released on July 10, 2007. In "Soundtrack of My Life", she talks about her life story from the relationship with her mother, cutting crack for her boyfriend, and drug and alcohol consumption. Eventually the album was shelved and she left Atlantic.

In 2013, after years of hiatus she's finally resumed her musical career by uploading new songs on her official YouTube account.

Discography

Albums
2007 Dying Get Rich (MIX CD for streets. released only in Japan)
2007 Soundtrack of My Life (unreleased)

Solo singles

References

External links
 Deemi Official Twitter
 Deemi Atlantic Records
 Deemi's official youtube channel

1980 births
Living people
American contemporary R&B singers
Songwriters from New York (state)
Atlantic Records artists
Musicians from Brooklyn
American musicians of Puerto Rican descent
21st-century American singers
21st-century American women singers
American hip hop singers
Women hip hop record producers
American women record producers